Hebeloma psammophilum is a species of mushroom in the family Hymenogastraceae.

psammophilum
Fungi of Europe